Johann Wilhelm Wagner (24 November 1681 in Heldburg/Thüringen – 16 December 1745 in Berlin) was a German astronomer.

Life and work

Between 1700 and 1703 he had a position as assistant to Georg Christoph Eimmart at his observatory in Nürnberg. In April 1704  Wagner began his studies at the University of Jena. From 1706 to 1709 he was at the private observatory of Baron Bernhard Friedrich von Krosigk (1656–1714) Berlin; in the following years followed various posts in  Russia and Silesia. From 1711 till either  1712 or 1713 he was a professor at a Ritterakademie.

In 1716  Wagner became Observator and Member of the  Preußischen Akademie der Wissenschaften. From  1720 he was  Professor for Mathematics at the Gymnasium in Hildburghausen, until it was closed in 1727. On 16 December 1722 his son Johann Friedrich Wilhelm Wagner was born in Hildburghausen. In 1730  Wagner became Professor of Architecture at the Akademie der Künste in Berlin, and in 1735 Librarian of the Academy of Sciences. In 1740 after the death of  Christfried Kirch he was named as his successor as Director of Berlin Observatory - a post which he held for the rest of his life. The almanac calculation at the Observatory am Observatorium took so much of his time that his son undertook some of his work in teaching at the Akademie der Künste. Wagner died unmarried in December 1745 from a heart attack.

External links 
 Johann Wilhelm Wagner, in: Astronomie in Nürnberg

References 

1681 births
1745 deaths
18th-century German astronomers
Academic staff of the Prussian Academy of Arts